Countess Carola von Schmettow (née Krautwurst; born 23 February 1964) is a German businesswoman and the chief executive officer of HSBC Trinkaus.

Early life 
Carola Krautwurst was born on 23 February 1964 in Düsseldorf. Her father was a civil engineer and her mother was a construction technician. She studied classical music with a concentration on vocal performance at the Robert Schumann Hochschule, graduating in 1989. She later attended the University of Düsseldorf, graduating in 1992 with a degree in mathematics and physical chemistry.

Career 
Von Schmettow started her career at HSBC Trinkhaus in 1992 and has served as a board member since 2006. In 2014, HSBC named her as chief executive of its German unit HSBC Trinkaus, replacing Andreas Schmitz.

In addition to her role at HSBC Trinkhaus, Von Schmettow serves on the board of directors for HSBC France, VV Versicherungsverein des Bankgewerbes, ThyssenKrupp. She also serves as chairperson of the management board for Burckhardt Compression, as well as the chairperson of the supervisory board at HSBC Trinkaus Investment Managers and at Internationale Kapitalanlagegesellschaft. She previously worked as the chief executive officer of HSBC Investments Deutschland GmbH. She is one of Germany's first female business executives in finance.

Other activities

Corporate boards
 Barmenia, Member of the Advisory Board (since 2016)
 L-Bank, Member of the Advisory Board
 Eurex Exchange, Chairman of the Exchange Council (since 2017)
 Frankfurt Stock Exchange, Member of the Exchange Council
 ThyssenKrupp, Member of the Supervisory Board (since 2012)
 Pension Fund for the Finance Industry (BVV), Member of the Supervisory Board
 HSBC France, Member of the Board of Directors (2015-2018)

Non-profit organizations
 Association of German Banks, Member of the Board of Directors 
 Deutsche Bundesbank, Member of the Advisory Board for North Rhine-Westphalia
 Fritz Thyssen Foundation, Member of the Board of Trustees
 German Derivatives Association (DDV), Member of the Strategic Board
 econsense, Member of the Board of Trustees
 Kaiserswerther Diakonie, Member of the Board of Trustees
 Tonhalle Düsseldorf, Member of the Board of Trustees
 ZEIT-Stiftung, Member of the Board of Trustees (since 2014)
 Volkswagen Foundation, Member of the Advisory Board (2011-2014)

Personal life 
She is married to Count Johannes von Schmettow and has five children.

References 

Living people
1964 births
German countesses
German chief executives
German financial businesspeople
20th-century German businesswomen
20th-century German businesspeople
Women chief executives
Chairmen of HSBC
Businesspeople from Düsseldorf
Heinrich Heine University Düsseldorf alumni
Von Schmettow family
21st-century German businesswomen
21st-century German businesspeople